The 1983 Toledo Rockets football team was an American football team that represented the University of Toledo in the Mid-American Conference (MAC) during the 1983 NCAA Division I-A football season. In their second season under head coach Dan Simrell, the Rockets compiled a 9–2 record (7–2 against MAC opponents), finished in second place in the MAC, and outscored all opponents by a combined total of 276 to 157.

The team's statistical leaders included Jim Kelso with 1,346 passing yards, Steve Morgan with 630 rushing yards, and Capus Robinson with 499 receiving yards.

Schedule

References

Toledo
Toledo Rockets football seasons
Toledo Rockets football